This article provides information on candidates who stood for the 1999 New South Wales state election. The election was held on 27 March 1999.

Retiring Members

Labor
 Bill Beckroge MLA (Broken Hill)
 Mick Clough MLA (Bathurst)
 Bob Harrison MLA (Kiama)
 Brian Langton MLA (Kogarah)
 Bob Martin MLA (Port Stephens)
 Stan Neilly MLA (Cessnock)
 Pat Rogan MLA (East Hills)
 Terry Rumble MLA (Illawarra)
 Doug Shedden MLA (Bankstown)
 Gerry Sullivan MLA (Wollongong)
 Dorothy Isaksen MLC
 Jim Kaldis MLC
 Bryan Vaughan MLC

Liberal
 Jeremy Kinross MLA (Gordon) – seat abolished, failed to win preselection for the Legislative Council
 Joe Schipp MLA (Wagga Wagga)
 Virginia Chadwick MLC
 Marlene Goldsmith MLC
 Max Willis MLC

National
 Peter Cochran MLA (Monaro)
 Adrian Cruickshank MLA (Murrumbidgee)
 Bruce Jeffery MLA (Oxley)
 Gerry Peacocke MLA (Dubbo)
 Bill Rixon MLA (Lismore)
 Jim Small MLA (Murray)
 Bob Smith MLC

Other
 Peter Macdonald MLA (Manly) – Independent

Legislative Assembly
Sitting members at the time of the election are shown in bold text. Successful candidates are highlighted in the relevant colour. Where there is possible confusion, an asterisk (*) is also used.

Legislative Council
Sitting members at the time of the election are shown in bold text. Tickets that elected at least one MLC are highlighted in the relevant colour. Successful candidates are identified by an asterisk (*).

See also
 Members of the New South Wales Legislative Assembly, 1999–2003
 Members of the New South Wales Legislative Council, 1999–2003

References
 New South Wales Elections 1999

1999